On Receiving an Account that his only Sister's Death was Inevitable was composed by Samuel Taylor Coleridge in 1794, and deals with the death of Coleridge's step-sister Ann (1791), as well as that of his brother Luke (1790). A later poem ('To a Friend'), was written for Coleridge's friend Charles Lamb and seeks to comfort him after the loss of his sister.

Background
After Coleridge's father died when he was young, he would often experience feelings of loneliness. He was distant from his mother, and his education at Christ's Hospital, London separated him from any of his relatives. However, while attending the school he did become close to his brothers George and Luke and sister Nancy. When Coleridge received notice of the death of his brother Luke in February 1790 and later of his sister Ann during March 1791 near the end of his school career, he decide to compose the sonnet "On Receiving an Account that his only Sister's Death was Inevitable". The poem was published over 40 years later in an edition of his works in 1834.

In December 1794, Coleridge composed a second poem that partially deals with the events of his sister's death. The poem, "To a Friend", was sent on 29 December to Lamb when Coleridge received notice that Lamb's sister was ill. Within the poem, Coleridge invokes the memory of his own sister in order to comfort his friend. The poem was sent along with his Religious Musings. "To a Friend" was published in Coleridge's 1796 edition of poems and later in the 1797 and 1803 editions.

Poem
"On Receiving an Account" is a "schoolboy sonnet" and begins:

Coleridge then uses the exclamation "ah", a standard in his poetry, in order to express feelings of regret:

The original manuscript of the poem contains a mistake of substituting "mother" instead of "father" when his mother was still alive and it was his father who was deceased. The lines were supposed to list those family members that have died, and the printed version was corrected to read:

To a Friend
Within "To a Friend", Coleridge describes his sister in motherly terms:

He continues with his description of her and her importance:

Themes
Like "On Receiving an Account", many of Coleridge's early poems deal with death and its many variations: Monody on the Death of Chatterton deals in part with Chatterton's suicide, "Destruction of the Bastile" deals with the French revolution and "Dura Navis" deals with fighting at sea and cannibalism. Although Coleridge mourns over his siblings and the suffering that comes when people die, he is equally concerned about his own suffering and his fear that he would go without being loved. This theme of suffering and lack of love appears in his other poems, including Dejection: An Ode.

The emphasis by Coleridge on his sister expresses both grief and his own isolation from others. In terms of relationships with siblings and sisters in general, Coleridge wrote a few other poems on the topic including "On Seeing a Youth Welcomed by his Sister" (1791) and a brief mention of his sister in "Frost At Midnight" (1798).

Critical response
Geoffrey Yarlott declares, "It is an inferior poem, interesting mainly because its final line contains his earliest premonition perhaps of his acute need for female affection and of what the loss of it meant." Similarly, Rosemary Ashton believes that the poem is "unremarkable as we might expect from an eighteen-year-old", and is interesting because the manuscript accidentally substituted "mother" for "father" .

Notes

References
 Ashton, Rosemary. The Life of Samuel Taylor Coleridge. Oxford: Blackwell, 1997.
 
 Kneale, J. Douglas. Romantic Aversions. Ithaca: McGill-Queen's Press, 1999.
 Mays, J. C. C. (editor). The Collected Works of Samuel Taylor Coleridge: Poetical Works I Vol I.I. Princeton: Princeton University Press, 2001.
 Paley, Morton. Coleridge's Later Poetry. Oxford: Oxford University Press, 2000.
 Papper, Emanuel and Nuland, Sherwin. Romance, Poetry, and Surgical Sleep. Westport: Greenwood, 1995.
 Yarlott, Geoffrey. Coleridge and the Abyssinian Maid. London: Methuen 1967.

Poetry by Samuel Taylor Coleridge
1794 poems
British poems